Caerketton Hill is a hill in the Pentland Hills range of Scotland. The nearest settlements are Currie, three miles to the west, and Loanhead, four miles to the east. Edinburgh's southern boroughs start about two kilometers north. The nearest hills are Allermuir Hill to the west and Woodhouselee Hill to the south. The Boghall Burn rises on the southern flank and eventually drains into the Firth of Forth via North Esk and Esk.

The crest marks a 16-meter diameter and 1.5 meter high cairn. It was disturbed and is therefore no longer preserved in its original condition. The cairn is protected as a scheduled monument.

Surroundings
A flint arrowhead was discovered on the western flank of Caerketon Hill in 1970. The exhibit is in the collection of the National Museum of Antiquities of Scotland, which is affiliated with the Royal Museum.

The remains of a hill fort can be found on a rocky outcrop almost ten meters high on the east flank. Located in a well-defended position, the facility was surrounded by at least one wall. There was a rampart on the west side. The fort is classified as a Scheduled Monument.

A dry ski run was installed on the north flank of the Caerketon Hill.

References

Hills of Edinburgh
Mountains and hills of Midlothian